The 1998 Big South Conference baseball tournament  was the postseason baseball tournament for the Big South Conference, held from May 8 through 10 at Knights Stadium in Fort Mill, South Carolina.  The top four finishers from the regular season participated in the double-elimination tournament. The champion, won the title for the second time and earned an invitation to the 1998 NCAA Division I baseball tournament.

Format
The top four finishers from the regular season qualified for the tournament.  The teams were seeded one through four and played a double-elimination tournament.

Bracket and results

All-Tournament Team

Most Valuable Player
David Dalton was named Tournament Most Valuable Player.  Dalton was a shortstop for Liberty.

References

Tournament
Big South Conference Baseball Tournament
Big South baseball tournament
Big South Conference baseball tournament